Turkkila is a Finnish surname. Notable people with the surname include:

Juulia Turkkila (born 1994), Finnish figure skater
Niilo Turkkila (1921–2012), Finnish wrestler

Finnish-language surnames